Austalis is a genus of Hoverflies, from the family Syrphidae, in the order Diptera.

Formerly members of this genus were considered part of Eristalis though as rather a distinct group. They are very similar to Eristalinus, but Austalis is defined by having a postalar pile tuft but lacking the pile on posterior portions of the anepimeron and lacking the patterning on the eyes typical of Eristalinus. They also share a distinct metallic colouring. Little is known of their life histories but the adults have been recorded feeding at Eucalyptus flowers.

Systematics 
List created by Thompson (2003) in defining the new genus.
A. aequipars (Walker, 1864)
A. bergi (Curran, 1947)
A. caledonica (Bigot, 1884)
A. calliphoroides (Shiraki, 1963)
A. ciliata (Meijere, 1913)
A. conjuncta (Ferguson, 1926)
A. copiosa (Walker, 1852)
A. cupreoides (Goot, 1964)
A. erythropyga (Walker, 1864)
A. inscripta (Doleschall, 1857)
A. latilimbata (Meijere, 1913)
A. lucilioides (Walker, 1861)
A. luciliomima (Hull, 1944)
A. muscoides (Walker, 1858)
A. muscomima (Hull, 1944)
A. postscripta (Walker, 1864)
A. pulchella (Macquart, 1846)
A. refulgens (Doleschall, 1858)
A. resoluta (Walker, 1858)
A. rhina Thompson, 2003
A. rhynchops (Bezzi, 1928)
A. roederi (Bergroth, 1894)
A. smaradgi (Walker, 1849)
A. triseriata (Meijere, 1913)

A further dozen species are known from the Oriental and Australasian regions but await formal description.

References

Diptera of Asia
Diptera of Australasia
Hoverfly genera
Eristalinae